Dyal is an unincorporated community in Nassau County, Florida, United States. It is located between U.S. 1 and County Road 115, in the western part of the county.

Geography

References

Unincorporated communities in Nassau County, Florida
Unincorporated communities in the Jacksonville metropolitan area
Unincorporated communities in Florida